The 1992 Nevada Wolf Pack football team represented the University of Nevada, Reno during the 1992 NCAA Division I-A football season. Nevada competed as a first-year member of the Big West Conference (BWC). The Wolf Pack were led by 17th-year head coach Chris Ault, who resigned after the end of the season to retain his job as athletic director. They played their home games at Mackay Stadium.

Schedule

References

Nevada
Nevada Wolf Pack football seasons
Big West Conference football champion seasons
Nevada Wolf Pack football